Garra annandalei, the Annandale garra or Tunga garra,  is a species of ray-finned fish in the genus Garra. It is found in northern Bengal, Bihar and Assam in India, Nepal, Myanmar and possibly Bhutan where it is found in rocky, clear and fast flowing mountain streams.

References 

Garra
Fish described in 1921